Hutchins is an unincorporated community and census-designated place in Hancock County, Iowa, United States. As of the 2010 census the population was 28.

Demographics

History
Hutchins was platted in 1893. The population of the community was 56 in 1902, and 25 in 1925.

References

Census-designated places in Iowa
Census-designated places in Hancock County, Iowa